Dešov is a municipality and village in Třebíč District in the Vysočina Region of the Czech Republic. It has about 400 inhabitants. The village is well preserved and is protected by law as a village monument reservation.

History
The first written mention of Dešov is from 1345.

References

Villages in Třebíč District